Château de Puyguilhem is located in the town of Thénac, in the department of Dordogne, Nouvelle-Aquitaine, France. 

The castle was captured in the 13th century by King Henry III of England. The castle was rebuilt by Bertrand de Panisseau after 1265.

References
http://aquitaine.culture.gouv.fr/dossiers-thematiques/monuments-historiques-patrimoine/monuments-historiques/monuments-historiques-en-dordogne/6dd0238848b39cca0d470ba555d68d1c/
https://monumentum.fr/chateau-puyguilhem-pa00083017.html

Châteaux in Dordogne